Nikola Marinović (born 29 August 1976) is a Serbian-Austrian handball player.

Club career
Marinović played for Crvena zvezda in the Handball Championship of FR Yugoslavia for five seasons, winning back-to-back titles in 1997 and 1998. He also spent one season with fellow Yugoslav side Lovćen, before moving abroad to Austria in 2002. Over the next seven years, Marinović played for SG Handball West Wien (2002–2005) and Bregenz (2005–2009).

International career
At international level, Marinović was capped for FR Yugoslavia before switching allegiance to Austria.

Honours
Crvena zvezda
 Handball Championship of FR Yugoslavia: 1996–97, 1997–98
Lovćen
 Handball Cup of FR Yugoslavia: 2001–02
Bregenz
 Handball Liga Austria: 2005–06, 2006–07, 2007–08, 2008–09
Kadetten Schaffhausen
 Swiss Handball League: 2015–16, 2016–17

References

External links

 

1976 births
Living people
Handball players from Belgrade
Naturalised citizens of Austria
Serbia and Montenegro male handball players
Serbian male handball players
Austrian male handball players
RK Crvena zvezda players
HSG Wetzlar players
Frisch Auf Göppingen players
Handball-Bundesliga players
Expatriate handball players
Serbia and Montenegro expatriate sportspeople in Austria
Austrian expatriate sportspeople in Germany
Austrian expatriate sportspeople in Switzerland